Huygens is a Dutch patronymic surname, meaning "son of Hugo".

Huygens may also refer to:
 Huygens (spacecraft), the probe which landed on Saturn's moon Titan in 2005
 2801 Huygens, an asteroid 
 Huygens (crater), a Martian crater